Kelyan Guessoum (born 5 February 1999) is a French professional footballer who plays as defender for Ligue 2 club Nîmes.

Career
On 29 May 2019, Guessoum signed his first professional contract with Nîmes. He made his professional debut with Nîmes in a 3–0 Coupe de la Ligue win over Lens on 29 October 2019.

Personal life
Born in France, Guessoum is of Algerian descent.

References

External links
 
 
 

1999 births
Living people
People from Alès
Association football defenders
French footballers
French sportspeople of Algerian descent
Championnat National 2 players
Championnat National 3 players
Nîmes Olympique players
Sportspeople from Gard
Footballers from Occitania (administrative region)